The 1988 USC Trojans football team represented the University of Southern California (USC) in the 1988 NCAA Division I-A football season. In their second year under head coach Larry Smith, the Trojans compiled a 10–2 record (8–0 against conference opponents), won the Pacific-10 Conference (Pac-10) championship, and outscored their opponents by a combined total of 370 to 184.

The Trojans won their first 10 games of the season, running the conference table and beating third-ranked Oklahoma at home.  They were ranked second in the nation before their match with number-one ranked Notre Dame.  After losing to the Fighting Irish in their final regular-season game, they faced Michigan in the Rose Bowl, losing 14–22.

Quarterback Rodney Peete led the team in passing, completing 223 of 359 passes for 2,812 yards with 18 touchdowns and 12 interceptions.  Aaron Emanuel led the team in rushing with 108 carries for 545 yards and eight touchdowns. Erik Affholter led the team in receiving yards with 68 catches for 952 yards and eight touchdowns.

Schedule

Personnel

Rankings

Game summaries

at Boston College

at Stanford

Oklahoma

at Arizona

Oregon

Washington

at Oregon State

California

at Arizona State

at UCLA

The Measles Game

Notre Dame

Notre Dame and USC entered the game undefeated and ranked number one and two respectively for the first time ever in their storied series. It was also the 24th time No. 1 faced No. 2 in college football history. The Trojans were having a great season under head coach Larry Smith and standout quarterback Rodney Peete. The Irish came into the game as underdogs, but spectacular play of defensive end Frank Stams and cornerback Stan Smagala aided the Irish offense, led by Tony Rice, to an Irish victory. The sellout crowd of 93,829 was the largest in this rivalry since 1955.

vs. Michigan (Rose Bowl)

Team players drafted into the NFL
The following players were claimed in the 1989 NFL Draft.

Awards and honors
Rodney Peete, Second in Heisman Trophy voting
Rodney Peete, Johnny Unitas Golden Arm Award

References

USC
USC Trojans football seasons
Pac-12 Conference football champion seasons
USC Trojans football